Disputatio nova contra mulieres, qua probatur eas homines non esse (English translation:  A new argument against women, in which it is demonstrated that they are not human beings) is a satirical misogynistic Latin-language treatise first published in 1595 and subsequently reprinted several times, particularly throughout the 17th and 18th centuries. Disputatio was written anonymously, although it has been attributed to Valens Acidalius, a 16th-century German critic.

Despite the fact that the treatise was meant to parody the Socinian Anabaptist belief that Jesus of Nazareth was not divine, it has also been "used as a serious text to pour ridicule on women". Disputatio proved to be unusually provocative in its time for a publication of its size, which eventually led to the Catholic Holy See listing the manuscript in its Index Librorum Prohibitorum (List of Prohibited Books) on multiple occasions.

See also

 Valens Acidalius

References
 Disputatio Nova Contra Mulieres/A New Argument Against Women A Critical Translation from the Latin with Commentary, Together with the Original Latin Text of 1595, Hart, Clive, Edwin Mellen Press, 1998.  .
 Treatise on the Question Do Women Have Souls and Are They Human Beings?: Disputatio Nova Expanded and Revised Edition, Hart, Clive, Edwin Mellen Press, 2003.  .
 Czapla, Ralf G. [Ed.]; Burkard, Georg [Ed.]; Burkard, Georg [Trans.]: Disputatio nova contra mulieres, qua probatur eas homines non esse / Acidalius, Valens. (Neue Disputation gegen die Frauen zum Erweis, dass sie keine Menschen sind). Heidelberg 2006. 

Censorship in Christianity
Feminist books
16th-century Latin books
Satirical publications
1595 books